Ammayane Sathyam (അമ്മയാണെ സത്യം, English: I Swear on my Mother) is a 1993 Malayalam film written and directed by Balachandra Menon. The film stars Mukesh, Annie, Balachandra Menon, Narendra Prasad, Jagathy Sreekumar, Ganesh Kumar, Thilakan, K. P. A. C. Lalitha, Paravoor Bharathan, Prem Kumar, and Mammukoya. Balachendra Menon remade the film in Tamil as Kandaen Seethayae, however the project was later shelved. 
He also introduced actress Annie through this film.

Plot
Fifteen-year-old Parvathi (Annie) witnesses her family getting murdered by Jaganatha Varma (Narendra Prasad). She runs away from them to save her life. To prevent getting caught, she disguises herself as a boy named Thomas and starts living as a servant in a house of bachelors. One of the bachelors, Omanakuttan (Mukesh) discovers that Thomas is actually a girl. After hearing her story, Omanakkuttan and his friends try to help her. Before Jaganatha Varma could kill her, Policeman S. Narayanan (Balachandra Menon) discovers his plan and saves Parvathi.

Cast

Mukesh as Omanakuttan
Annie as  Parvathi / Thomas / Ramkumar Chengammanad a.k.a. Raman 
Balachandra Menon as S. Narayanan
Narendra Prasad as Jaganatha Varma
Jagathi Sreekumar as Pisharadi
K. B. Ganesh Kumar as Cherian
Paravoor Bharathan as Iyer
Karamana Janardanan Nair as Omanakuttan's Father
K. P. A. C. Lalitha as Omanakuttan's Mother
Prem Kumar as Sreeni
Mamukkoya as Mujeeb Rahman
Babu Namboothiri as Parvathi's Father
Renuka as Parvathi's Mother 
Shyama
Thilakan as R. Varghese Mathew
Harisree Asokan
Kaithapram Damodaran Namboothiri as Nampoothiri
Chithra as Margret
Usharani as Jaganatha Varma's wife

References

External links
 

1990s Malayalam-language films
1993 crime thriller films
1990s romance films
1993 films
Cross-dressing in Indian films
Films directed by Balachandra Menon
Films scored by M. G. Radhakrishnan
Films scored by Vijay Shankar